Steve Freeman Niamathé (born 12 March 1995) is a Central African footballer who plays as a centre-back for Red Star Bangui and the Central African Republic national team.

Club career
Ndobé debuted with the Central African Republic national team in a 4–1 2020 African Nations Championship qualification loss to DR Congo on 20 October 2019.

References

External links
 
 

1995 births
Living people
People from Bangui
Central African Republic footballers
Central African Republic international footballers
Association football defenders